The Highliner is a bilevel Electric Multiple Unit railcar. The original series of railcars were built in 1971 by the St. Louis Car Company for commuter service on the Illinois Central Railroad, in south Chicago, Illinois, with an additional batch later produced by Bombardier. A second generation featuring a completely new design was produced by Nippon Sharyo beginning in 2005.

History
In 1926, the Illinois Central's commuter rail lines were electrified, and began operating as the "IC Electric". For almost 40 years, the IC Electric continued to operate the original fleet of heavyweight cars, until the railroad decided that a more modern railcar was needed to resume commuter operations. The Chicago South Suburban Mass Transit District was formed in 1967 in order to qualify for federal funding to purchase new equipment for the route. The original 130 car Highliner fleet had a cost of approximately $40 million; $26.6 million was funded by a federal grant, with the remainder coming from the Illinois Central. The railcars operated on electric catenary, and were more efficient than their heavyweight predecessors. A typical Highliner was able to seat 156 passengers, and run faster than the heavyweight fleet.

In 1976, the newly formed Regional Transportation Authority began to fund the IC Electric commuter service. In 1983, the RTA created Metra, Chicago's commuter rail service, and in 1987, Metra purchased the IC Electric line, forming the Metra Electric Line.

An additional batch of 36 Highliners was built from 1978 to 1979 by the Bombardier company. Starting in 2005, the aged original fleet, which was increasingly prone to breakage and experiencing soaring maintenance costs, began to be phased out. They were replaced by new Highliners built by Nippon Sharyo of Japan, the same company that is currently in charge of production of Metra's fleet of gallery cars. The last revenue run of the original Highliner cars was on February 12, 2016.  Metra confirmed in a Facebook post that twenty-four cars are being sent to museums around the Midwestern United States, including the Illinois Railway Museum, while the other cars were sent to Mendota, Illinois to be scrapped.

Highliner II
The Nippon Sharyo Highliners are similar in appearance to the passenger cars used on Metra's diesel lines. The South Shore Line electric railroad of Illinois and Indiana also purchased and operates the Highliner II to supplement its fleet of EMUs.

Fleet

References

External links
 
 Specification for Highliner I at bottom of PDF
 ‘ Highliner ’ Gallery Type Bi-Level EMU for METRA - Nippon Sharyo Official Website
 Gallery Type Bi-Level EMU for NICTD  - Nippon Sharyo Official Website

Highliner
Highliner
St. Louis multiple units
Electric multiple units of the United States
1500 V DC multiple units
Double-decker EMUs
Bombardier Transportation multiple units
Nippon Sharyo multiple units